Chamaesphecia doleriformis is a moth of the family Sesiidae. It is found in Italy, Austria, the Czech Republic, Slovakia, the Balkan Peninsula, Ukraine, Russia and Turkey.

The larvae feed on Salvia austriaca, Salvia pratensis, Salvia nemorosa, Salvia sclarea and Salvia verbenaca.

Subspecies
Chamaesphecia doleriformis doleriformis (Italy, Istria to Dalmatia and to Greece)
Chamaesphecia doleriformis colpiformis (Staudinger, 1856)

References

Moths described in 1846
Sesiidae
Moths of Europe
Moths of Asia